The World War I Centennial silver dollar is a commemorative coin issued by the United States Mint in 2018.

References

2018 establishments in the United States
Modern United States commemorative coins